Walter "Wolfman" Washington (December 20, 1943 – December 22, 2022) was an American singer and guitarist, based in New Orleans, Louisiana, United States. While his roots were in blues music, he blended in the essence of funk and R&B to create his own unique sound.

Biography 
Washington was born in New Orleans, and whilst still in his teens, he was invited to play in Lee Dorsey's band.

In the mid 1960s, Washington formed the All Fools Band, and played at clubs in New Orleans.

In the 1970s, he joined Johnny Adams' band. He played with Adams for 20 years, both performing live and also appearing on his records. During this time he continued to work as a solo artist, and in the late 1970s formed his own band, the Roadmasters, and toured Europe with them.

Washington released his first solo album Rainin' In My Life in 1981 from a small local label Hep' Me. He landed a contract with Rounder Records in 1985, and he released three albums with that label. After the Rounder days, he also released an album, Sada, on Point Blank Records.

Washington started to play regularly with two New Orleans musicians, the organist Joe Krown  and the drummer Russell Batiste, Jr., working as a trio at the Maple Leaf Bar.

Washington appears in performance footage in the 2005 documentary film Make It Funky!, which presents a history of New Orleans music and its influence on rhythm and blues, rock and roll, funk and jazz. In the film, he performs "Barefootin'" with the house band.

In 2008, he released Doin' the Funky Thing, his first album in many years. Live at the Maple Leaf, a live recording by Krown, Washington, Batiste was also released in the same year.

Washington died of cancer in New Orleans, on December 22, 2022, two days after his 79th birthday.

Discography 
 1981 Leader Of The Pack (Hep' Me)
 1986 Wolf Tracks (Rounder)
 1987 Rainin' In My Life (Maison de Soul)
 1988 Out of the Dark (Rounder)
 1991 Wolf at the Door (Rounder)
 1991 Sada (Point Blank)
 1998 Funk Is in the House (Bullseye Blues)
 1999 Blue Moon Risin''' (Artelier)
 2000 On the Prowl (Rounder)
 2008 Doin' the Funky Thing (Zoho Roots)
 2014 Howlin' LIVE at DBA New Orleans (Frenchmen Street Records)
 2018 My Future Is My Past'' (ANTI-Records)

References

External links

Walter "Wolfman" Washington official site
Walter "Wolfman" Washington interview NAMM Oral History Library, March 20, 2015.
 
 

1943 births
2022 deaths
African-American guitarists
American blues guitarists
American male guitarists
American funk guitarists
American rhythm and blues guitarists
Rhythm and blues musicians from New Orleans
Soul-blues musicians
Blues musicians from New Orleans
Guitarists from Louisiana
Rounder Records artists
Zoho Music artists
20th-century American guitarists
20th-century American male musicians
20th-century African-American musicians
21st-century African-American people
Anti- (record label) artists
Maison de Soul Records artists